The Kokura Kinen (Japanese 小倉記念) is a Grade 3 horse race for Thoroughbreds aged three and over, run in August over a distance of 2000 metres on turf at Kokura Racecourse.

The Kokura Kinen was first run in 1965 and has held Grade 3 status since 1984. The race was run over 1800 metres at Kyoto Racecourse in 1998.

Winners since 2000

Earlier winners

 1984 - Ogon Takeru
 1985 - Shadai Chatter
 1986 - Yakumo Desire
 1987 - Golden Beauty
 1988 - President City
 1989 - Dantsu Miracle
 1990 - Snow Jet
 1991 - Nice Nature
 1992 - Ikuno Dictus
 1993 - Marubutsu Sunkist
 1994 - Hokusei Amber
 1995 - Spring Bamboo
 1996 - Hishi Natalie
 1997 - Gaily Eagle
 1998 - T M Oarashi
 1999 - Embrasser Moi

See also
 Horse racing in Japan
 List of Japanese flat horse races

References

Turf races in Japan